Acraea vuilloti is a butterfly in the family Nymphalidae. It is found in Tanzania, from the eastern part of the country to Usambara, Uluguru, Usagara and Bagamayo.

Description

A. vuilloti Mab. (56 d). Very close to Acraea pharsalus. The ground-colour of the forewing is often completely broken up into spots and the hindwing has a large white spot at the inner margin in cellules 1 b to 2 (to 3). Hindwing also beneath with dark marginal band. Marginal streaks thick, but not triangular. German East Africa.

Taxonomy
It is a member of the Acraea pharsalus species group.

References

External links

Die Gross-Schmetterlinge der Erde 13: Die Afrikanischen Tagfalter. Plate XIII 56 d 
 Images representing  Acraea vuilloti at Bold

Butterflies described in 1889
vuilloti
Endemic fauna of Tanzania
Butterflies of Africa
Taxa named by Paul Mabille